Emperor is a 2020 American Western historical drama film directed by Mark Amin (in his directorial debut) and written by Amin and Pat Charles. The film stars Dayo Okeniyi, James Cromwell, Kat Graham, and Bruce Dern. It is based on the true story of Shields Green, an African American slave nicknamed "Emperor", who escaped to freedom and participated in abolitionist John Brown's raid on Harpers Ferry.

Plot
In 1859, after the plantation on which Shields "Emperor" Green works in Charleston, South Carolina, is gambled away by his master, a cruel new overseer tortures Shields and whips his son Tommy. In retaliation, Shields kills the overseer and flees. Shields' wife Sarah is killed during his escape.

Shields evades capture on his way north and learns that a bounty has been placed on his head. His master and neighboring plantation owners hire bounty hunter Luke McCabe to catch him. Shields is found by Truesdale, who gives him refuge in his house despite his wife Delores' objection; however, the next day, Truesdale turns on him and forces Shields to lock himself in a cage, revealing his intention to wait for the bounty hunters to capture Shields for the reward money. Delores kills Truesdale and frees Shields, who takes the responsibility for the latter's murder.

Shields meets up with a young bank robber, Rufus Kelly. McCabe and his men pursue them and almost catch them, and Rufus dies from the injuries in the process. Shields takes his gun and looted money and meets up with Levi Coffin (a real Quaker abolitionist) at his cabin. There, he gives him the money to buy his son's freedom. After McCabe appears, Shields heads to Maryland where meets John Brown and Frederick Douglass, who is preparing the raid at Harpers Ferry. Shields agrees to join them to fight for the end of slavery.

Shields, Brown and his men take over Harpers Ferry. United States Army Colonel Robert E. Lee and his forces retake it and most of Brown's men suffer casualties. As Shields rides away on a horse, McCabe shoots and wounds him. Shields takes refuge at a church, but McCabe and his men track him down. During a gun battle. Shields climbs to the spire, pursued by McCabe, and blows it up as he leaps into a river to make his escape. Coffin buys Tommy's freedom and takes him to Shields.

In 1890, his son writes a book about him and takes it to a publisher.

Cast
 Dayo Okeniyi as Shields Green
 Naturi Naughton as Sarah Green
 Trayce Malachi as Tommy Green
 Keean Johnson as Rufus Kelly
 Ben Robson as Luke McCabe
 Bruce Dern as Levi Coffin
 James Cromwell as John Brown
 Harry Lennix as Frederick Douglass
 James Le Gros as Robert E. Lee
 Paul Scheer as Duvane Henderson
 M. C. Gainey as Randolph Stevens
 Nicholas Logan as Gunther Bowman
 Kat Graham as Delores
 Mykelti Williamson as Truesdale
 Brad Carter as Grady
 Samuel Lee Fudge as Henry
 Mark Ashworth as Reverend
 Nubel Feliz Yan as Esclavo

Production
Emperor is the directorial debut of producer Mark Amin. Filming began on June 18, 2018, in Savannah, Georgia, and lasted for 28 days. Locations used included Fort James Jackson (as Harpers Ferry) and the Wormsloe Historic Site.

Release
In January 2020, Briarcliff Entertainment acquired the film's U.S. distribution rights, and planned to release it in theaters on March 27, 2020. This release was canceled due to the COVID-19 pandemic, and the film was instead released on DVD, digital and video on demand on August 18, 2020, by Universal Pictures Home Entertainment.

Reception
Emperor received mixed reviews.

Glenn Kenny of The New York Times gave a mixed review, praising the lead Okeniyi's acting while finding the plot to be "unimaginative" and the dialogue "tired".

Martin Thomas of Double Toasted put the film as his #1 worst film of 2020, describing it as poorly written, historically inaccurate.

On RogerEbert.com, Simon Abrams gave it one star, calling it toothless, insulting, inert, tacky, lousy, and mediocre. "It re-presents a dark period in American history without being inspired or insightful enough to be worth your curiosity or emotional investment."

Historical accuracy
Shields Green had broken speech and was hard to understand; he may have had a speech defect. Douglass described him as "a man of few words". Shields Green actually met both Douglass and John Brown at the former's home in Rochester, New York, where John was visiting and working on his project. What Green was doing as a slave in South Carolina is unknown, but that he managed a plantation is very unlikely. In Rochester, living in Douglass's house, he worked as a barber and launderer. Green did not escape from the raid on Harper's Ferry. He was captured, tried, and convicted along with Brown for treason against Virginia, murder, and inciting a slave insurrection, and hanged two weeks after Brown. There is no evidence that Green saw his son again after he left South Carolina, nor that his son wrote a book about him. While the fact that he had a son is documented, that he had "sons" is not. The names of his wife and son are unknown.

References

External links

2020 directorial debut films
2020 drama films
2020 Western (genre) films
2020s American films
2020s English-language films
2020s historical drama films
African-American Western (genre) films
American films based on actual events
American historical drama films
Cultural depictions of John Brown (abolitionist)
Cultural depictions of Frederick Douglass
Drama films based on actual events
Films about American slavery
Films not released in theaters due to the COVID-19 pandemic
Films scored by Javier Navarrete
Films set in 1859
Films set in 1890
Films set in Charleston, South Carolina
Films set in Maryland
Films set in Virginia
Films shot in Savannah, Georgia
Western (genre) films based on actual events